Cara Island is a small island which is located off the west coast of Kintyre in Scotland.

Geography and etymology
It is accessible from Gigha.

Cara has a translation in Gaelic as "dearest" or "dear one". Cara is a popular girl's name in the local area and in Scotland in general.

History

Cara is currently owned by MacDonald Lockhart of Kintyre and is reputed to be the only island still in the possession of a direct descendant of the Lords of the Isles. The only habitable building on the island is Cara House.

The liner Aska was sunk on 22 September 1940 on rocks northwest of the island after being struck by German bombers.

Wildlife
Cara is well known for a herd of feral goats, which still thrive on the wild landscape.

Mythology

Cara is famous as the home of the Uruisg/broonie, the familiar spirit of the Macdonald of Largie family. A rock formation known as the Broonie's Chair is found at the extreme southern tip of the island.

References

External links

Uninhabited islands of Argyll and Bute